Andrés Celis Montt (born 8 April 1975) is a Chilean lawyer and politician.

He was municipal councillor of Viña del Mar from 2000 to 2016. On 21 November 2019, he was re-elected in his position of deputy.

References

External links
 BCN Profile

Living people
1975 births
21st-century Chilean lawyers
21st-century Chilean politicians
National Renewal (Chile) politicians
Adolfo Ibáñez University alumni
People from Viña del Mar
Municipal councillors of Viña del Mar